Johnny Castle may refer to
Johnny Castle, bass guitar in band, The Nighthawks
Johnny Castle, lead character in film, Dirty Dancing